Thomas James Waters (17 July 1842 – 5 February 1898) was an Irish civil engineer and architect. He was active in Bakumatsu and early Meiji period Japan.

Biography
Waters was born in Birr, County Offaly, in Ireland in 1842, as the eldest son of the local surgeon. In 1864, while in his early 20s, he appears to have become involved in the building of the Royal Mint in Hong Kong. Through his uncle, Albert Robinson, he came into contact with representatives of Thomas Blake Glover, a noted British merchant resident in Nagasaki. Glover arranged for Waters to be employed by Satsuma Domain to construct steam-powered sugar mills on the island of Amami-Oshima, and he then moved to Kagoshima to design western-style buildings in 1867. After the Meiji Restoration of 1868, Waters was hired by the new Meiji government and commissioned to build the new Imperial Japanese Mint in Osaka, which was commenced in 1868 and completed in 1870.

After successfully completing this commission, he was invited to Tokyo and officially accepted as foreign advisor by the government, where his title was "Surveyor-General". He helped design a branch of the Japanese Mint in the Ginza area of Tokyo, designed and built the headquarters building for the Imperial Japanese Army and a bridge in the Tokyo Imperial Palace grounds, Tokyo. However, his largest commission came after a devastating by fire in 1872 destroyed the Ginza district. Tom Waters,  his brother Albert Waters, and English colleague A N Shillingford, supervised the rebuilding of the Ginza area with a broad central thoroughfare, lined with a series of one- and two-story Georgian brick buildings there. The district was henceforth known as Bricktown (Rengagai), and came to be regarded as a symbol of modernity and westernization in Japan.

However, Waters soon faced increasing competition from foreign architects and newly trained Japanese architects and engineers. He ended ties with Japan around 1878.

He worked briefly in Shanghai, China before working as a mining engineer in the South Island of New Zealand. He then joined his brothers, Ernest and Albert in the United States where they became involved in silver and gold mining in Colorado. He died on 5 February 1898 at the age of 55, and his grave is located at Fairmount Cemetery in Denver, Colorado.

Further reading
Dr Meg Vivers has published articles and a book about Thomas Waters.

References

External links
More information about "Senpukan"
Ginza Bricktown (woodcut)

Irish expatriates in Japan
Foreign advisors to the government in Meiji-period Japan
1842 births
1898 deaths
19th-century Anglo-Irish people
Irish expatriates in the United States
19th-century Irish architects
People from Birr, County Offaly